Tasnova Hoque Elvin (born 26 April 1990) better known as Tasnova Elvin is a Bangladeshi actress and model. Tasnova Elvin began her journey in showbiz as a top 15 contestant in Lux Channel I Superstar 2010, but soon broke out as an actor. She has appeared in Bachelor Point, among other television drama series.

Early life
Elvin was born in Brahmanbaria, Bangladesh to Ferdowsi and Fazlul Haque, a businessman.

During her second year at university, Elvin was a top 15 contestant in Lux Channel I Superstar 2010. 
She completed her Bachelor of Business Administration from American International University-Bangladesh.

Career
Elvin started her career with television advertisement Pran Mango Juice Pack.

She presented the show Anya Alor Gaana on Boishakhi Television. Her first acting role was either in director Taher Shipon's Alice in Wonderland or his Bhengey Jawa Swapnogulo with Chanchal Chowdhury (sources disagree about which came first). In 2016, she modeled for the music video of Hriday Khan's song "Tumi Amar" and anchored the comedy show Haw Kaw Show.

Personal life
Elvin married Fahad Riazi, a merchandiser, on 26 March 2017.

Filmography

TV dramas and telefilms

References

External links
 
 

Living people
1990 births
Bangladeshi actresses
Bangladeshi female models
Bengali television actresses
People from Brahmanbaria district
American International University-Bangladesh alumni